Julio James Alcantara MBE was the Mayor of Gibraltar. He was appointed to the office of Deputy Mayor on 1 August 2010 and appointed to be Mayor on 1 August 2011. A former headteacher, he was previously Gibraltar's Director of Education.

Alcantara was appointed Member of the Order of the British Empire (MBE) in the 2011 New Year Honours for services to education and the community in Gibraltar.

References

Mayors of Gibraltar
Living people
Members of the Order of the British Empire
1944 births